Jasmin Wöhr (born 21 August 1980) is a retired German tennis player.

Biography 
During her career, Wöhr won four doubles titles on the WTA Tour, as well as one singles title and 23 doubles titles on the ITF Women's Circuit. On 14 December 1998, she reached her best singles ranking of world No. 188. On 23 July 2007, she peaked at No. 46 in the doubles rankings.

Playing for Germany Fed Cup team, Wöhr accumulated a win–loss record of 3–1.

In 1997, she won the Australian Open girls' doubles title with Mirjana Lučić.

Wöhr retired from professional tennis in 2012.

Junior Grand Slam finals

Doubles: 1 (1 title)

WTA career finals

Doubles: 10 (4–6)

ITF Circuit finals

Singles: 1 (1–0)

Doubles: 38 (23–15)

References

External links

 
 

1980 births
Living people
Sportspeople from Tübingen
German female tennis players
Australian Open (tennis) junior champions
Grand Slam (tennis) champions in girls' doubles
Tennis people from Baden-Württemberg